Oxynoemacheilus karunensis is a species of stone loach which is endemic to Iran. It was first described in 2016.

References

karunensis
Endemic fauna of Iran
Taxa named by Jörg Freyhof
Fish described in 2016